In the Tall Grass is a horror novella  by American writers Stephen King and his son Joe Hill. It was originally published in two parts in the June/July and August 2012 issues of Esquire magazine. This is King and Hill's second collaboration, following 2009's Throttle. On October 9, 2012, In the Tall Grass was released in e-book and audiobook formats, the latter read by Stephen Lang. It has also been published in Full Throttle, a 2019 collection of short fiction by Hill.

Plot summary
Cal and Becky Demuth are inseparable siblings (being called Irish twins by their parents, as they are 19 months apart). Becky finds out during her sophomore year of college that she is pregnant, leading the twins' parents to suggest she go live with her aunt and uncle until the baby is born. Since it is spring break, Cal decides to accompany her on her cross-country trip. They stop at numerous tourist locations along the way.

After driving for three days, they stop at a field of grass over nine feet high after they hear a boy named Tobin calling for help. The twins also hear his mother Natalie yelling at him to stop making noise, warning "he will hear you". Cal thinks Tobin is just a few feet inside the field and walks into it to rescue the boy, Natalie's cries having mysteriously gone silent. Tobin sounds close so he dives for him, only to find no one there and realize that Tobin's voice now sounds far away.

Becky calls the authorities as she follows Cal into the field, but loses the signal just a few feet in. Cal and Becky get the idea to jump within the field to determine each other's position. The first attempt reveals they are only a yard from one another, but upon a second attempt Becky sees Cal is now a significant distance from her. Cal stumbles across a golden retriever's dead body, having died of dehydration. Becky and Cal become increasingly agitated when they realize the field is somehow shifting their location from one another, one minute sounding close and the next leagues away.

Becky recites limericks to comfort herself as well as give Cal and Tobin an anchor point to her location. She spies someone ahead, and a man steps out of the grass. He introduces himself as Ross, saying that he is the father of Tobin and the husband of Natalie. He begs Becky to follow him, saying that she will be safe with him. Despite her reservations, Ross convinces her to follow him anyway. He lures her to a stamped-down circle of grass, where Becky finds Natalie's bloody, dismembered body. Ross explains that he found "the rock" and that "the dancing men have shown [him] the secrets of the tall grass". He attacks, but Becky stabs him to death with her house key.

Cal, now severely dehydrated and exhausted in his attempt to look for Becky, feverishly drinks the gritty water that the grass grows in. Now crazed, he attempts to burn down the field with matches, but the grass is too wet to set alight. He finally runs into Tobin, who is eating a dead, rotting crow. Tobin explains that the rotting dog was his, and that "the tall grass doesn't move dead things." Tobin leads Cal to a clearing in the middle of the field, where a large rock covered with carvings of dancing men stands.  Tobin says that the rock will help Cal find Becky like it helped Tobin find him. Cal, despite his fear of the rock and the strange carvings that seem to move on their own, gives in and touches it.

Meanwhile, Becky gives birth prematurely. Cal and Tobin appear and wrap the baby in a shirt. She passes out to "slurping sounds." When she wakes up, her baby is nowhere in sight. Cal and Tobin drag a half-conscious Becky to the rock and throw her on it.

An unspecified amount of time later, an RV full of hippies pulls into the parking lot of an abandoned church across the road from the field to have a barbecue. They hear Tobin's calls for rescue, and the whole group walks into the tall grass to help.

Film adaptation 

Director Vincenzo Natali had wanted to make a film adaptation of In The Tall Grass as early as 2015, when he stated:

 

In May 2018, Netflix announced that it had purchased the film rights, setting Natali to direct and adapt the screenplay. In the Tall Grass began streaming on Netflix on October 4, 2019.

See also
 Stephen King short fiction bibliography

References

External links
Part 1 published at Esquire
Part 2 published at Esquire

2012 short stories
Horror short stories
Novellas by Stephen King
Works originally published in Esquire (magazine)
Works by Joe Hill (writer)
American novels adapted into films
Collaborative novels